Coralie Hayme (born 26 January 2001) is a French judoka.

She is the bronze medallist of the 2021 Judo Grand Slam Abu Dhabi in the -78 kg category.

She won one of the bronze medals in the women's +78 kg event at the 2022 Mediterranean Games held in Oran, Algeria.

References

External links
 
 

2001 births
Living people
French female judoka
Competitors at the 2022 Mediterranean Games
Mediterranean Games bronze medalists for France
Mediterranean Games medalists in judo
21st-century French women